Fast Track English was a German educational television series produced by WDR, teaching English as a foreign or second language to German viewers. Produced in 1997 and 1998, the series was divided into two parts—the main Fast Track English, which focuses on the essentials of the English language in daily life over 26 episodes; and Fast Track English - "The Business World", a 13-part series about the use of English in business.

See also
America – The Freedom to Be
List of German television series

German educational television series
1997 German television series debuts
1998 German television series endings
English-language education television programming
Das Erste original programming